Graham Matthews (born 17 April 1953) is an Australian former cricketer. He played 21 first-class cricket matches for Victoria between 1976 and 1981.

See also
 List of Victoria first-class cricketers

References

External links
 

1953 births
Living people
Australian cricketers
Victoria cricketers
Cricketers from Melbourne